Jeux sans frontières was a Europe-wide television game show. The 1998 edition was won by Százhalombatta, Hungary

Participating countries and cities

Heat 1

Venue: Palazzo delle Albere, Trento, Italy

Heat 2

Venue: Palazzo delle Albere, Trento, Italy

Heat 3

Venue: Palazzo delle Albere, Trento, Italy

Heat 4

Venue: Palazzo delle Albere, Trento, Italy

Heat 5

Venue: Palazzo delle Albere, Trento, Italy

Heat 6

Venue: Palazzo delle Albere, Trento, Italy

Heat 7

Venue: Palazzo delle Albere, Trento, Italy

Heat 8

Venue: Palazzo delle Albere, Trento, Italy

Heat 9

Venue: Palazzo delle Albere, Trento, Italy

Final

Venue: Palazzo delle Albere, Trento, Italy,

the teams which qualified from each country to the final were:

Final table

Jeux sans frontières
1998 television seasons
Television game shows with incorrect disambiguation